George Jarkesy (born August 1974) is a hedge fund manager, media commentator, and conservative talk radio show host of the George Jarkesy Radio Show.

Career
Jarkesy started his career in the mid-1990s in the financial services industry with a New York Stock Exchange member. Over the past two decades he has been an investor in entrepreneurial growth companies. Jarkesy has originated and/or participated in several hundred investments over the past 20 years, including both debt and equity in private, pre-public and public companies. Jarkesy has founded, invested in and helped to build companies engaged in a broad range of industry sectors, including financial consulting, media, real estate, real estate management, employee leasing, light steel manufacturing, livestock management, technology, natural resources, healthcare and biotechnology.

As an investor and financial guru, Jarkesy has been a regular guest on shows like the Neil Cavuto show, The Willis Report with Geri Willis, CNBC's Worldwide Exchange, Fox Business's Willis Watch Dogs, Fox's Fox and Friends, CNBC "The Call" with Kudlow

Public speaker
Jarkesy has been giving speeches at events such as the Tea Party Rally in Conroe Texas  where he encouraged attendees to engage and help get out the word about the perceived decline of the US.

Founder of National Eagles and Angels Association
Jarkesy is the founder of the National Eagles and Angels Association. The NEAA is a nationwide alliance of investors and business angels that support entrepreneurial growth companies. The organization holds daytime workshops for networking and collaborative breakout sessions; provides mentor-ship services; hosts informative podcasts; and hosts online video conferences for solution sharing. The NEAA has chapters in many cities around the country. With monthly and quarterly meetings, entrepreneur are brought together to present their businesses to investors and business angels. Sometimes business is transacted, but always, good contacts and friendships are made. Oftentimes the angels provide mentorship training to the business owners to steer them in a direction of higher profitability.

Songwriter
Jarkesy has shown disappointment with the actions of former-President Barack Obama during his term, and voiced concerns about potentially unconstitutional executive Orders, as well as allegations that he appointed communists into departmental roles. That former-President Obama surrounded himself with advisors with close ties to the Muslim Brotherhood, the decline of the American coal industry, and allegations that there has been targeted persecution and harassment of conservatives by government agencies. These concerns were voiced in a song he wrote named "The Bad Obama Blues"

Politics
Jarkesy identifies as a Republican, both donating money for candidates at various of state and federal levels. He has spoken often on political unrest in America, often signalling out former-President Obama for his policy decisions and considers himself one of the first to accuse Obama of being a supposed Communist. After feeling dissatisfaction with the Obama Presidency, Jarkesy a radio show bearing his name. On his show he raised concerns over the supposed government overreach, potential abuses of power coming from within the Executive Branch including specific legal overreach by government agencies.

Columnist
Jarkesy has written numerous columns including: “Global Warming” RIP, American Economy Needs Relief for TownHall.com, to Solyndra, Solar Dreams, Bankruptcy and More Government Waste for BusinessInsider.com, to Golden Parachutes for the common American, Janet Yellen at the world! for TownHallFinance.org  and Marx and Marshall Would Be Proud Of Obama's Attack On Religion for Town Hall's Money World, Will We Have to Tell Our Grandchildren About How America Used to be? for Glenn Beck's The Blaze, Taxapalooza for EconIntersect.com  and Steele got the job done for the Baltimore Sun. While most of his writing was financial or economic in nature, the underlying theme was the opinion that former-President Obama was consistently ruining the country. There are few others in the media at his level that are as outspoken about the administration's economic policies and the devastation effect that they have had on out economy under Obama.

The George Jarkesy Radio show
Jarkesy regularly appears on both radio and TV as a commentator on business and politics on CNBC's Worldwide Exchange, Fox Business's

Jarkesy Launched a nationally syndicated radio show in 2012 on the Wall Street Radio Network owned by Salem Media. The George Jarkesy Radio Show launched on January 9, 2012 in five markets nationwide. The show will be bringing a mix of politics and business to Houston, Atlanta, Orlando, Boston, and Sacramento. Jarkesy draws upon his past experience as an entrepreneur, investor and businessman to provide his insights about the economy, markets, and politics. 

The George Jarkesy Show added Minneapolis/St. Paul, Minnesota radio station KYCR AM 1570 on the Wall Street Business Network is its newest affiliate, on May 7, 2012. The following month, in June 2012, The George Jarkesy Radio Show expanding into the Dallas/Fort Worth area Monday as the show added KVCE AM 1160 to their expanding list of affiliates.

Guests on the show have included: Congressman Kevin Brady, Congressman Randy Weber, Senator Chuck Schumer, Charlie Daniels, Dr. Thomas Sowell, Senator Doctor Tom Coburn,

Hedge fund manager
On March 22, 2013, Jarkesy was charged with civil charges of fraud by the SEC. The charges accuse Jarkesy and Thomas Belesis of John Thomas Financial of defrauding investors in two hedge funds. According to the complaint, amongst other things, Jarkesy told investors that he was the fund manager, when in fact a number of decisions were made by Belesis. Additionally, investors were led to believe the funds were audited by KPMG when they were not.

References

External links 
 George Jarkesy welcomes Congressman Kevin Brady to the show to talk about the economy and the steps the Federal Reserve needs to take.
 The George Jarkesy Radio Show Website
 George Jarkesy - Angels In Training - the Houston Business Journal
 George Jarkesy - Captain of Industry Opportunist Magazine
 The S.E.C.'s Use of the 'Rocket Docket' Is Challenged - NYTimes.com
 Case May Give D.C. Circuit Chance to Review Constitutionality of SEC Administrative Forum
 JARKESY et al v. UNITED STATES SECURITIES AND EXCHANGE COMMISSION JARKESY et al v. UNITED STATES SECURITIES AND EXCHANGE COMMISSION :: District Of Columbia District Court

1974 births
Living people
American hedge fund managers
American talk radio hosts